John Horsfall is the name of:

John Horsfall (bishop)
Sir John Cousin Horsfall, 1st Baronet (1846–1920) of the Horsfall baronets
Sir (John) Donald Horsfall, 2nd Baronet (1891–1975) of the Horsfall baronets
Sir John Musgrave Horsfall, MC, JP, 3rd Baronet (1915–2005) of the Horsfall baronets